Karlovy Vary (formerly also spelled Carlsbad in English) is a spa city in the Karlovy Vary Region of the Czech Republic. It has about 46,000 inhabitants. It lies on the confluence of the rivers Ohře and Teplá. It is named after Charles IV, Holy Roman Emperor and the King of Bohemia, who founded the city.

Karlovy Vary is the site of numerous hot springs (13 main springs, about 300 smaller springs, and the warm-water Teplá River), and is the most visited spa town in the Czech Republic. The historic city centre with the spa cultural landscape is well preserved and is protected by law as an urban monument reservation. It is the largest spa complex in Europe. In 2021, the city became part of the transnational UNESCO World Heritage Site under the name "Great Spa Towns of Europe" because of its spas and architecture from the 18th through 20th centuries.

Administrative parts
Karlovy Vary is made up of 15 city parts and villages:

Karlovy Vary
Bohatice
Čankov
Cihelny
Doubí
Drahovice
Dvory
Hůrky
Olšová Vrata
Počerny
Rosnice
Rybáře
Sedlec
Stará Role
Tašovice

Cihelny forms an exclave of the municipal territory.

Etymology
The city is named after its founder. The name Karlovy Vary means literally "Charles' Baths". The city was also colloquially called Warmbad ("hot bath").

Geography
It lies at the confluence of the Ohře (which flows across the city) with the Teplá and Rolava rivers.

The northern part of the municipal territory with most of the built-up area lies in a relatively flat landscape of the Sokolov Basin. The southern part, including the valley of the Teplá River, lies in a hilly landscape of the Slavkov Forest and in the eponymous protected landscape area.

Climate

History

An ancient late Bronze Age fortified settlement was found in Drahovice. A Slavic settlement on the site of Karlovy Vary is documented by findings in Tašovice and Sedlec. People lived in close proximity to the site as far back as the 13th century and they must have been aware of the curative effects of thermal springs.

From the end of the 12th century to the early 13th century, German settlers from nearby German-speaking regions came as settlers, craftsmen and miners to develop the region's economy. Eventually, Karlovy Vary/Karlsbad became a town with a German-speaking population. 

In 1325, Obora, a village in the today's city area, was mentioned. Karlovy Vary as a small spa settlement was founded most likely around 1349. According to legend, Charles IV organized an expedition into the forests surrounding modern-day Karlovy Vary during a stay in Loket. It is said that his party once discovered a hot spring by accident, and thanks to the water from the spring, Charles IV healed his injured leg. On the site of a spring, he established a spa mentioned as in dem warmen Bade bey dem Elbogen in German, or Horké Lázně u Lokte (Hot Spas at the Loket). The location was subsequently named "Karlovy Vary" after the emperor. Charles IV granted the town privileges on 14 August 1370. Earlier settlements can also be found on the outskirts of today's city.

Modern times

An important political event took place in the city in 1819, with the issuing of the Carlsbad Decrees following a conference there. Initiated by the Austrian Minister of State Klemens von Metternich, the decrees were intended to implement anti-liberal censorship within the German Confederation.

Due to publications produced by physicians such as David Becher and Josef von Löschner, the city developed into a spa resort in the 19th century and was visited by many members of European aristocracy as well as celebrities from many fields of endeavour. It became even more popular after railway lines were completed from Prague to Cheb in 1870.

The number of visitors rose from 134 families in the 1756 season to 26,000 guests annually at the end of the 19th century. By 1911, that figure had reached 71,000, but the outbreak of World War I in 1914 greatly disrupted the tourism on which the city depended.

At the end of World War I in 1918, the large German-speaking population of Bohemia was incorporated into the new state of Czechoslovakia in accordance with the Treaty of Saint-Germain-en-Laye (1919). As a result, the German-speaking majority of Karlovy Vary protested. A demonstration on 4 March 1919 passed peacefully, but later that month, six demonstrators were killed by Czech troops after a demonstration became unruly.

According to the 1930 census, the city was home to 23,901 inhabitants – 20,856 were of German ethnicity, 1,446 of Czechoslovak ethnicity (Czech or Slovak), 243 of Jewish ethnicity, 19 of Hungarian ethnicity and 12 of Polish ethnicity. 

In 1938, the majority German-speaking areas of Czechoslovakia, known as the Sudetenland, became part of Nazi Germany according to the terms of the Munich Agreement. After World War II, in accordance with the Potsdam Agreement, most inhabitants were forcibly expelled because of their German ethnicity. In accordance with the Beneš decrees, their property was confiscated without compensation.

Since the end of Communist rule in Czechoslovakia in 1989 and the fall of the Soviet Union in 1991, the presence of Russian businesses in Karlovy Vary has steadily increased.

Demographics
In 2017, non-Czech residents were around 7% of the population of the Karlovy Vary region. After Prague, this is the highest proportion in the Czech Republic. The largest group of foreigners were Vietnamese, followed by Germans, Ukrainians and Russians.

Economy
The city's economy is focused on services and only small and medium-sized industrial enterprises are based in it. The main industry is the food and beverage industry, characterized by the bottling of mineral waters and the production of unique delicacies. Karlovy Vary is known for the popular Czech liqueur Becherovka, which has been produced here since 1807. The Karlovarské oplatky (Carlsbad wafers) originated in the city in 1867. The city has also lent its name to "Carlsbad plums", candied stuffed prune plums.

The second important industry is the production of glass and porcelain. Karlovy Vary is known for the lead glass manufacturer Moser Glass founded in 1857, which is considered the most luxurious Czech brand.

Spa

Karlovy Vary is the most visited spa town in the Czech Republic. As the principal city on the West Bohemian Spa Triangle and the largest spa complex in Europe, Karlovy Vary has over 80 springs. They are a part of the Eger Graben, a tectonically active region in western Bohemia. Although the infiltration area is several hundred square kilometres, each spring has the same hydrological origins, and therefore shares the same dissolved minerals and chemical formula. The hottest of the springs can approach 74 °C, while the coldest have temperatures under 40 degrees. All of the springs combined provide roughly 2,000 litres of water every minute.

Transport
Local buses (Dopravní podnik Karlovy Vary) and cable cars take passengers to most areas of the city. The Imperial funicular is the oldest tunnel funicular in Europe and the steepest in the Czech Republic, the Diana funicular was at the time of commissioning the longest funicular in Austria-Hungary.

The city is accessible via the D6 motorway and inter-city public transport options include inter-city buses, České dráhy, and Deutsche Bahn via the Karlovy Vary–Johanngeorgenstadt railway.

Culture

In the 19th century, Karlovy Vary became a popular tourist destination, especially known for international celebrities who visited for spa treatment. The city is also known for the Karlovy Vary International Film Festival, which is one of the oldest in the world and one of Europe's major film events.

The city has been used as the location for a number of film-shoots, including the 2006 films Last Holiday and Casino Royale, both of which used the city's Grandhotel Pupp in different guises. Moreover, the Palace Bristol Hotel in Karlovy Vary had been used as a model for The Grand Budapest Hotel.

Sport
Karlovy Vary is home to the top-tier ice hockey club HC Karlovy Vary, and the top-tier volleyball club VK Karlovarsko.

The city is also represented by the football club FC Slavia Karlovy Vary, which plays in the third tier of the Czech football system.

Sights

Karlovy Vary is notable for its large concentration of monuments and architecturally valuable buildings. The origin of most of them is connected with the spa tradition of the city. Since 2018, the spa centre of the city along the Teplá river and the wider surroundings with the spa cultural landscape have been protected as an urban monument reservation. As part of the Great Spa Towns of Europe, Karlovy Vary became a UNESCO World Heritage Site because of its spas and architecture from the 18th through 20th centuries.

Churches
Catholic Church of Saint Mary Magdalene – built by Kilian Ignaz Dientzenhofer in 1737
Orthodox Saint Peter and Paul Cathedral – 1898
Protestant Church of Saints Peter and Paul – 1856
Church of Saint Anne – 1745
Greek Catholic cemetery Church of Saint Andrew – 1500
Methodist Church of Saint Luke – 1877
Ruins of the Church of Saint Leonard of Noblac from 1246
Synagogue (opened 1994)

Notable people

Johann Josef Loschmidt (1821–1895), Austrian scientist
Ignaz Ziegler (1861–1948), Austrian-Czech rabbi
Walter Serner (1889–1942), writer, dadaist
Karl Hermann Frank (1898–1946), Nazi official
Walter Becher (1912–2005), German-Czech politician
Zbyněk Brynych (1927–1995), film director
Gerda Mayer (born 1927), English poet
Georg Riedel (born 1934), Swedish musician and composer
Karin Stoiber (born 1943), former First Lady of Bavaria
Rudolf Křesťan (born 1943), writer
Princess Michael of Kent (born 1945), member of the British royal family
Stanislav Birner (born 1956), tennis player
Josef Řihák (born 1959), politician
Rick Lanz (born 1961), Canadian ice hockey player
Ludmila Peterková (born 1967), clarinetist
Karel Dobrý (born 1969), actor
Karel Rada (born 1971), footballer
Jana Sýkorová (born 1973) opera singer
Tomáš Vokoun (born 1976), ice hockey player
Petr Kopfstein (born 1978), aerobatic pilot
Tomáš Došek (born 1978), footballer
Milan Šperl (born 1980), cross country skier
Hana Soukupová (born 1985), supermodel
Tomáš Borek (born 1986), footballer

Associated with the city
Peter the Great (1672–1725), visited Karlovy Vary in 1711
Johann Wolfgang von Goethe (1749–1832), German poet, novelist and scientist, published a paper on local geology
James Ogilvy, 7th Earl of Findlater (1750–1811), Scottish noble and an accomplished amateur landscape architect and philanthropist, regularly visited the spa and became a patron of the city
Jean de Carro (1770–1857), Swiss physician, published the Almanach de Carlsbad
Ludwig van Beethoven (1770–1827), composer, came twice for spa treatments. In 1812, he performed a concert in the Czech Hall of the Grandhotel Pupp.
Adalbert Stifter (1805–1868), Austrian writer, treated here in 1865–1867
Frédéric Chopin (1810–1849), composer, he and his parents met for the last time during a holiday in Karlsbad, August/September 1835
Ivan Turgenev (1818–1883), Russian novelist, visited Karlsbad on numerous occasions
Anthony J. Drexel (1826–1893), senior partner of Drexel, Morgan & Co. (JPMorgan, today) and founder of Drexel University, died in Karlsbad in 1893
Mustafa Kemal Atatürk (1881–1938), founder of the Republic of Turkey, as well as its first President, treated here in 1918
František Běhounek (1898–1973), scientist and novelist, died here
Vladimir Voronin (born 1941), former president of the Republic of Moldova, visits Karlovy Vary every year for spa treatments

International relations
Carlsbad, New Mexico, United States (after which Carlsbad Caverns National Park is named), Carlsbad, California, USA Carlsbad Springs, Ontario, Canada, and Carlsbad, Texas, USA, take their names from Karlovy Vary's English name, Carlsbad. All of these places were so named because they were the sites of mineral springs or natural sources of mineral water.

Twin towns – sister cities

Karlovy Vary is twinned with:

 Baden-Baden, Germany
 Bernkastel-Kues, Germany
 Carlsbad, United States
 Eilat, Israel
 Kusatsu, Japan
 Locarno, Switzerland
 Varberg, Sweden

Gallery

Panorama

References

Further reading

External links

 
Official tourist portal
Unofficial tourist portal
Pictures & Streetmap from 1725 (?), A. F. Zuerner/Schenck (Amsterdam)
Pictures & Streetmap from 1733, Homannische Erben (Nuernberg)
Karlovy Vary City Card – guide, maps, discounts

 
Spa towns in the Czech Republic
Cities and towns in the Czech Republic
Populated places in Karlovy Vary District
Towns in the Ore Mountains